Thaung Tun may refer to:
 Thaung Tun (filmmaker)
 Thaung Tun (politician)